Stefanków  is a village in the administrative district of Gmina Chlewiska, within Szydłowiec County, Masovian Voivodeship, in east-central Poland.

The village has a population of 184.

History
Within the Polish Kingdom, the village was administratively located in the Sandomierz Voivodeship in the Lesser Poland Province of the Polish Crown.

In 1827, it had a population of 101.

During the German occupation of Poland (World War II), on March 29, 1940, the Germans murdered 69 Poles from Stefanków in a massacre committed in the Firlej district in the city of Radom (see Nazi crimes against the Polish nation).

References

Villages in Szydłowiec County